Blush may refer to:

 Blushing, the physiological occurrence of temporary redness of the face as an emotional response
 Blush (cosmetics) or rouge, a cosmetic
 Blush (magazine), a Canadian lifestyle magazine
 Blush wine, a kind of rosé wine
 Blush (color), a medium bright tone of red-violet
 Blush, Albania
 Blush, a Crayola crayon color
 Blush (surname)

Film and television 
 Blush (1995 film), a Chinese film
 Blush (2015 film), an Israeli film
 Blush (2019 film), an American film
 Blush (2021 film), a 2021 animated short film on AppleTV+
 Blush: The Search for the Next Great Makeup Artist, a 2008 American reality TV show
 "Blush" (Kim Possible), an episode of Kim Possible
 Blush, a 2002 dance program and 2005 film by Wim Vandekeybus

Music 
 Blush (Asian band), a pan-Asian girl band
 Blush (Mexican band), a 2011 all-girl rock-pop band from Mexico
 Blush, a band signed to Surfdog Records
 Blush (Wa Wa Nee album), 1989
 Blush (Moose Blood album)
Blush (Maya Hawke album)
 Blush (Wolf Alice EP)
 Blush (Jeffree Star EP)
 "Blush", a song by Aly & AJ from Insomniatic
 "Blush", a song by The Hummingbirds from loveBUZZ
 "Blush (Only You)", a song by Plumb from Chaotic Resolve

Characters 
 Blush, a female mascot for Children in Need 2009
 Blush, a character in the manga Et Cetera (manga)

See also 
 Blusher, a group of mushroom species